Parapercis kamoharai is a fish species in the sandperch family, Pinguipedidae. 
It is found in Japan, Taiwan and Hong Kong.

Etymology
The fish is named in honor of ichthyologist Toshiji Kamohara (1901-1972), of the Kochi University.

References

Masuda, H., K. Amaoka, C. Araga, T. Uyeno and T. Yoshino, 1984. The fishes of the Japanese Archipelago. Vol. 1. Tokai University Press, Tokyo, Japan. 437 p. (text).

Pinguipedidae
Taxa named by Leonard Peter Schultz
Fish described in 1966